Burtnieki Municipality is a former municipality in Vidzeme, Latvia. The municipality was formed in 2006 by merging Vecate Parish and Matīši Parish. In 2009 it absorbed Burtnieki Parish, Ēvele Parish, Rencēni Parish and Valmiera Parish, the administrative centre being in Burtnieki.

On 1 July 2021, Burtnieki Municipality ceased to exist and its territory was merged into Valmiera Municipality.

See also 
 Administrative divisions of Latvia (2009)

References 

 
Former municipalities of Latvia